Terborg is a railway station in Terborg, Netherlands. The station was opened on 15 July 1885 and is located on the Winterswijk–Zevenaar railway. The train services are operated by Arriva.

Train services

Bus services

References

External links

NS website 
Dutch Public Transport journey planner 
Arriva Gelderland website 
Arriva Achterhoek Network Map 

Railway stations in Gelderland
Railway stations opened in 1885
Oude IJsselstreek